Mantophryne lateralis is a species of frog in the family Microhylidae. It is endemic to New Guinea and is found on the north coast of Papua in Indonesia and both north and south of the Central Range in Papua New Guinea. It is also known from the Normanby Island (Papua New Guinea). Common name Victoria archipelago frog has been proposed for it.

Mantophryne lateralis is an abundant and widespread species that occurs in tropical rainforests at elevations below . It is adaptable and has also been recorded from rural gardens. It is active at night on the forest floor. It has direct development (i.e., there is no free-living larval stage). There are no known threats to this species whose range overlaps with a number of protected areas.

References

lateralis
Endemic fauna of New Guinea
Amphibians of Papua New Guinea
Amphibians of Western New Guinea
Amphibians described in 1897
Taxa named by George Albert Boulenger
Taxonomy articles created by Polbot